The Cape triplefin, Cremnochorites capensis, is a triplefin blenny of the family Tripterygiidae and only member of the genus Cremnochorites, found in the western Indian Ocean and southeast Atlantic, from Sodwana Bay to False Bay in South Africa.

References

Further reading
 G M Branch, C L Griffiths, M L Branch, & L E Beckley, Two Oceans, A Guide to the Marine Life of Southern Africa, (David Philip Publishers (Pty) Ltd, Claremont, South Africa 1994) 

Tripterygiidae
Fish described in 1908
Taxa named by John Dow Fisher Gilchrist
Taxa named by William Wardlaw Thompson